ANLC may refer to
 Alaska Native Language Center, an institute dedicated to linguistic research and preservation at the University of Alaska, Fairbanks
 American Negro Labor Congress (1925-1930), a mass organization of the Communist Party, USA